NewsLocal is a subsidiary of News Corp Australia that operates its community newspapers in New South Wales.  It used to be Cumberland-Courier Community Newspapers.

In April 2020, Newscorp announced they would suspend print publication of a number of local and regional newspapers due to the impact of the coronavirus pandemic in Australia.

Current newspapers are:
 Blacktown Advocate
 Canterbury-Bankstown Express
 Central (newspaper)
 Express Advocate Gosford Edition
 Express Advocate Wyong Edition
 Fairfield Advance
 Hills Shire Times
 Hornsby & Upper North Shore Advocate
 Inner West Courier
 Liverpool Leader
 Macarthur Chronicle Camden Edition
 Macarthur Chronicle Campbelltown Edition
 Macarthur Chronicle Wollondilly Edition
 Manly Daily
 Mosman Daily
 Mt Druitt Standard
 North Shore Times
 Northern District Times
 Northside (newspaper)
 Parramatta Advertiser
 Penrith Press
 Southern Courier
 Village Voice - Balmain
 Wentworth Courier

Defunct newspapers include:
 Lake Macquarie News

References

External links 
 
 http://www.newsspace.com.au/communitynews/newslocal

Newspaper companies of Australia